Campylospermum is a genus of plants in the family Ochnaceae.

Species include:

Campylospermum amplectens 
Campylospermum anceps 
Campylospermum andongense 
Campylospermum angulatum 
Campylospermum auriculatum 
Campylospermum barberi 
Campylospermum bukobense 
Campylospermum cabrae 
Campylospermum calanthum 
Campylospermum claessensii 
Campylospermum congestum 
Campylospermum costatum 
Campylospermum deltoideum 
Campylospermum densiflorum 
Campylospermum dependens 
Campylospermum descoingsii 
Campylospermum duparquetianum 
Campylospermum dybovskii 
Campylospermum elongatum 
Campylospermum engama 
Campylospermum excavatum 
Campylospermum flavum 
Campylospermum gabonense 
Campylospermum glaberrimum 
Campylospermum glaucifolium 
Campylospermum glaucum 
Campylospermum glomeratum 
Campylospermum klainei 
Campylospermum laeve 
Campylospermum laevigatum 
Campylospermum laxiflorum 
Campylospermum lecomtei 
Campylospermum longestipulatum 
Campylospermum louisii 
Campylospermum lunzuense 
Campylospermum lutambense 
Campylospermum mannii 
Campylospermum nutans 
Campylospermum obtusifolium 
Campylospermum occidentale 
Campylospermum oliveri 
Campylospermum paucinervatum 
Campylospermum perseifolium 
Campylospermum reticulatum 
Campylospermum sacleuxii 
Campylospermum scheffleri 
Campylospermum schoenleinianum 
Campylospermum serratum 
Campylospermum squamosum 
Campylospermum striatum 
Campylospermum subcordatum 
Campylospermum sulcatum 
Campylospermum umbricola 
Campylospermum vogelii 
Campylospermum warneckei

References

 
Malpighiales genera
Taxonomy articles created by Polbot